Mike Teasdale (born 28 July 1969) is a Scottish former footballer, who played for Elgin City, Dundee and Inverness Caledonian Thistle.

External links 

1969 births
Living people
People from Elgin, Moray
Association football fullbacks
Scottish footballers
Elgin City F.C. players
Dundee F.C. players
Inverness Caledonian Thistle F.C. players
Scottish Football League players
Sportspeople from Moray